The Central Street School is an historic school building located at 379 Central Street in Central Falls, Rhode Island.  This -story wood-frame building was built by the city in 1881 to meet burgeoning demand for education brought about by the success of the local mills.  The building is cruciform in shape, with Italianated hooded entrances at opposited ends of the east–west axis of the building.  Each floor houses two classrooms.

The building was listed on the National Register of Historic Places in 1979.

See also
National Register of Historic Places listings in Providence County, Rhode Island

References

Buildings and structures in Central Falls, Rhode Island
School buildings on the National Register of Historic Places in Rhode Island
Schools in Providence County, Rhode Island
National Register of Historic Places in Providence County, Rhode Island
Historic district contributing properties in Rhode Island